Iturbe is a town north of the Quebrada de Humahuaca in the Jujuy Province, Argentina. It is located in the Humahuaca Department, 161 km from the city of San Salvador de Jujuy at a height of 3223 meters. It is also known under the names of Hipolito Yrigoyen and Negra Muerta.

Populated places in Jujuy Province